In the geologic timescale, the Rhuddanian is the first age of the Silurian Period and of the Llandovery Epoch. The Silurian is in the Paleozoic Era of the Phanerozoic Eon. The Rhuddanian Age began 443.8 ± 1.5 Ma and ended 440.8 ± 1.2 Ma (million years ago). It succeeds the Himantian Age (the last age of the Ordovician Period) and precedes the Aeronian Age.

GSSP 
The GSSP for the Silurian is located in a section at Dob's Linn, Scotland, in an artificial excavation created just north of the Linn Branch Stream. Two lithological units (formations) occur near the boundary. The lower is the Hartfell Shale ( thick), consisting chiefly of pale gray mudstone with subordinate black shales and several interbedded meta-bentonites.

See also 
 Ordovician-Silurian extinction events
 Early Palaeozoic Icehouse

References 

 
Llandovery epoch
Silurian geochronology